The Square Ring is a 1960 Australian TV play based on a stage play by Australian Ralph Petersen which had been successful on the stage in England and been filmed in 1953.

It was recorded live in Sydney.

Plot
The story of six fighters who wait for their turn in the ring one night at a boxing ring in England. Ex champ Docker Starkie is trying to make a comeback; Eddie Burke is a new boy on the way up; Harry Coombers is a certain future champion; Rick Martell is planning on throwing a fight; Sailor Johnson is a broken-down has-been; Rawlings likes to read books before a fight.

Mixing with them all is the dressing room attendant Danny Felton who has seen fighters come and go and understand them. There is also associated characters like a stadium manager.

Cast
Don Barkham as Eddie Burke
Guy Doleman as Harry Coombes
Jack Fegan as Docker Starkie
Ken Goodlet as Sailor Johnson
Joe Jenkins as Rowdie Rawling
Owen Weingott as Rick Martell
Edward Hepple as Danny Felton, the handler
Al Thomas as the stadium manager
Ben Gabriel Joe
Louis Wishart as stadium doctor
Max Osbiston as Watty
John Unicomb as Ford

Production

Sydney boxing trainer Ern McQuillan was the technical advisor for the story. Joe Jenkins, who appeared often on television as a dancer, makes his acting debut as Rowdie Rawlings. He would later go on to appear in several Australian TV dramas such as The Emperor Jones, Two-Headed Eagle and The End Begins.

References

External links
The Square Ring at IMDb
The Square Ring at Ausstage
Information from 1960 TV production at National Archives of Australia

1960s Australian television plays